The Kabka Sultanate, also called the Sultanate of Kabka and the Kabka Sultanate of Tundubay, is a remote Zaghawa-populated country subdivision on the Sudanese frontier within Chad.  It was created by Chadian President Idriss Deby in order to appease Zaghawa nationalism and national pride.

References

Subdivisions of Chad